Paper Chase or Paperchase may refer to:

 Paper Chase (game), a racing game
 Paperchase, a UK premium stationery retailer operating internationally.
 The Paper Chase, a 1966 memoir by Hal Porter

Fiction 
 The Paper Chase (Symons novel), a 1956 novel by Julian Symons
 The Paper Chase (Osborn novel), a 1971 novel by John Jay Osborn Jr.
 The Paper Chase (film), a 1973 film based on Osborn's novel
 The Paper Chase (TV series), a 1978-1986 series based on the novel and film
 Paper Chase, a 1964 novel by Mark Saxton
 Paper Chase, a 1988 spy novel by William Garner
 The Confessions of Mycroft Holmes: A Paper Chase (UK title: The Paperchase), a 2001 novel by Marcel Theroux

Television episodes
 "Paper Chase" (77 Sunset Strip)
 "Paper Chase" (The Bill)
 "Paper Chase" (Blue Heelers)
 "The Paper Chase" (Danger Man)
 "The Paper Chase" (Edgemont)
 "Paper Chase" (Family Ties)
 "The Paper Chase" (Felicity)
 "Paper Chase" (Home to Roost)
 "The Paper Chase" (The Paper Chase)
 "The Paper Chase!" (The Raccoons)
 "Paper Chase" (The Saint)
 "Paper Chase" (Step by Step)
 "Paperchase" (The Wind in the Willows)

Music 
 The Paper Chase (band), an American alternative rock band
 "Paper Chase", a song by The Academy Is... from Fast Times at Barrington High
 "Paperchase", a song by Do or Die from Picture This
 "Paperchase", a song by Paul Weller from Sonik Kicks
 "Paperchase", a song by Anthony Phillips from Wise After the Event